The Worldwar series is the fan name given to a series of eight alternate history science fiction novels by Harry Turtledove. Its premise is an alien invasion of Earth during World War II, and includes Turtledove's Worldwar tetralogy, as well as the Colonization trilogy, and the novel Homeward Bound. The series' time span ranges from 1942 to 2031. The early series was nominated for a Sidewise Award for Alternate History in 1996.

Series premise
Worldwar deals with a military invasion that begins on or around May 30, 1942 by a force of aliens that calls itself The Race, a reptilian species. It had reached Earth orbit in December 1941 but delayed the attack for various reasons.

Although the Race has the advantage of superior technology, its information on humanity had been collected by a robotic probe during the 12th century AD. The invaders are surprised to find that humanity progressed far more rapidly than any other species that they had previously studied and conquered. Contrary to its expectations, at the time of invasion, the Race's technology is only marginally more advanced than 20th-century Earth technology. The commander hesitates, and considers turning back without revealing The Race's presence to the humans but finally decides to avoid the disgrace of that course of action.

The narrative follows the intersecting fortunes of a large number of human and alien characters. Notably, the series depicts how the Axis and Allied powers must cooperate to fight the alien menace.

As is gradually revealed, the Race unified its home planet into a single state with a military technology at a level similar to our history's late 20th century. It then had tens of thousands of years of further history, but for most of the time, it fought no wars and so had no incentive or need to develop more advanced weapons. Indeed, for most of the time, it maintained no army at all. Only the discovery of other planets with intelligent beings made the Emperor proclaim a "Soldier's Time" and build up an army, and the weapons developed at the last wars when the home planet was unified were quite enough to conquer the other planets. With Earth, it turned out differently since the various human nations were faced with arms some decades ahead of theirs but were soon able to close the gap.

Literary theme
Turtledove approaches the novels' science fiction scenario by focusing less on the technological and fantasy elements that are typically associated with the genre. Instead, he shows more concern for the role of more mundane affairs, such as the political repercussions of an alliance between the Allied and the Axis powers, the impact the presence of alien creatures has on human society, and the ways in which warfare is paradoxically a hindrance to civilization and simultaneously a catalyst for the progress of civilization.

Particular attention is given to the deep dilemma facing the Jews in both Poland and Palestine. The invaders, by landing in 1942, stop the ongoing Holocaust and close down Auschwitz for which the Jews are understandably grateful, but collaborating with the reptile invaders would brand the Jews as traitors to humanity.

First series
The first series is made up of four volumes:
 Worldwar: In the Balance (1994)
 Worldwar: Tilting the Balance (1995)
 Worldwar: Upsetting the Balance (1996)
 Worldwar: Striking the Balance (1996)

It ends with neither humanity nor the aliens triumphing. Instead, each side fights to the point that facing mutually-assured destruction, they settle into an uneasy ceasefire. The aliens want to colonize Earth and have nuclear weapons but want to use them only sparingly. They cannot colonize a radioactive wasteland after a full-scale nuclear exchange.

The invasion ultimately ends with all of the major Allied and Axis powers managing to develop their own nuclear weapons, which results in a stalemate. The Race is left in control of roughly half the planet, primarily colonial possessions in the Southern Hemisphere: Africa, South and Central America, Australia, and most of Asia aside from the Soviet Union and a few Japanese coastal holdings.

Uneasy peace
The second series of novels, set in the 1960s, deals with the interaction between surviving humans and the Race. Opening with the arrival of the colonization fleet, the series ends with the defeat of Nazi Germany and the establishment of a permanently-occupied US space station in the asteroid belt. Part of the series focuses on the Reich-Race War of the mid-1960s, when the Greater German Reich and the Race fight a nuclear war.

The Germans lose and are forced to allow France to become an independent nation again under a new Fourth Republic. Nonetheless, it is a costly victory for the Race since fighting Germany on its own after 20 years of human technological advancement proved to be much more difficult than fighting all free human nations earlier. It is left obvious to both sides that the long-term trends are in humanity's favor.

The Race is also faced with ongoing guerilla wars in much of the territory that they conquered, especially by Communists in China and by Islamists in the Arab World. The Race, confirmed conservative monarchists who never developed any concept of republic and whose only religion is veneration of their Divine Emperor and the ghosts of past emperors, find it difficult to understand either Communism or Islam, but they are forced to admit that both are highly-effective ideologies in motivating humans to fight and to cause considerable difficulties to their occupiers.

Another major issue turns out to be ginger, an innocent flavoring in human cuisine but a powerful narcotic for the Race's metabolism. It creates problems of addiction and helps create new criminal networks involving both humans and rogue members of the Race. Moreover, inhaling ginger causes females of the Race to become sexually active outside of their normal mating season. That creates new problems, as the Race has no concept whatsoever of sexual activity being private, and when sexually aroused, it tends to engage in indiscriminate orgies to the scandal of the humans who happen to watch. For their part, members of the Race find it difficult to understand humans' insistence on sex being a private act, and the humans' great annoyance when reptiles walk in on them while engaged in it.

Colonization Trilogy
Second Contact (1999)
Down to Earth (2000)
Aftershocks (2001)

Interstellar
The final novel in the saga deals with humanity reaching the Race's homeworld, "Home" (Tau Ceti II).
Homeward Bound (2004)

List of characters

The following is a list of some of the major characters from the series.

Humans
Mordechai Anielewicz (historical): Anielewicz, together with other Polish Jews, is liberated from Nazi occupation by the Race. In the wake of salvation, Anielewicz is faced with the agonizing dilemma between siding with the Race against Nazi Germany or fighting against the Race, an act that would make them allies of the Nazis.
Flight Lieutenant George Bagnall: A flight engineer in the Royal Air Force.
David Goldfarb: A radar operator in the Royal Air Force.
Lieutenant Ludmila Gorbunova: One of many female pilots in the Soviet Union's Red Air Force.
Colonel Leslie Groves (historical): The head of America's atomic bomb development.
Colonel Heinrich Jäger: A tank commander in the German Sixth Army who is advancing on Stalingrad when the alien invasion begins. He is depicted as a good and somewhat charismatic officer.
Jens Larssen: A physicist at the University of Chicago. He is sent on a cross-country trip to alert the US government of the importance of the atomic bomb project.
Vyacheslav Molotov (historical): The head of the Soviet Union's Foreign Ministry. He is among the first humans to orbit the Earth and is instrumental in negotiating the Peace of Cairo with the Race.
Moishe Russie: A student of medicine in Poland when the Germans invaded in 1939.
Otto Skorzeny (historical): The Waffen-SS Hauptsturmführer, he is known for his unconventional thinking. The commando becomes a particularly feared human to the Race.
Sam Yeager: A minor-league ball player with the Decatur Commodores when the invasion takes place. Like many young men, he tried to enlist in the army in the wake of the Japanese attack on Pearl Harbor at the end of 1941 but was rejected for a medical issue.
Liu Han: A Chinese housewife whose innocuous village was raided by the Race and Japanese forces almost simultaneously. Kidnapped by the Race to be a part of their experiments, she becomes connected with the communist guerrillas in China, eventually joins the party, and rises through the ranks to become a leader in the revolutionary movement.

The Race
Fleetlord Atvar: The commander of the Race's Conquest Fleet.
Flight Leader Teerts: A killercraft pilot from the Conquest Fleet. He is among the jet fighters that rapidly neutralize human air power in the opening days of the invasion.
Straha: A Shiplord (ship captain) who vocally opposes Atvar's strategies.
Ussmak: A driver for the crew of a landcruiser in the Conquest Fleet. He is one of the Lizard "Everyman" viewpoint characters.

Historical characters
Numerous historical characters also appear, some having brief cameos and others having significant parts in the plot:

In the Balance

Tadeusz Bór-Komorowski: General in the Polish Home Army. In reality, he became commander of the Home Army in the second half of 1943, after the previous commander, Stefan Grot-Rowecki, was arrested by the Gestapo.
Winston Churchill: Prime Minister of the United Kingdom
Adolf Hitler: German Führer
Cordell Hull: US Secretary of State
George Marshall: US Army Chief of Staff
George S. Patton: US Army Major General
Joachim von Ribbentrop: German foreign minister
Leó Szilárd: Nuclear physicist, University of Chicago Metallurgical Laboratory
Hans Thomsen: German ambassador to the United States
Shigenori Tōgō: Japanese foreign minister
Walter Henry Zinn: Nuclear physicist, University of Chicago Metallurgical Laboratory
Enrico Fermi: Italian nuclear physicist, University of Chicago Metallurgical Laboratory

Tilting the Balance

Eric Blair: BBC talks producer, Indian Section, London. Better known by his pen name, George Orwell.
Kurt Chill: Wehrmacht general and interpreter in Pskov
Arthur Compton: Nuclear physicist with the Metallurgical Laboratory
Kurt Diebner: Nuclear physicist, Hechingen, Germany
Enrico Fermi: Nuclear physicist with the Metallurgical Laboratory
Laura Fermi: Enrico Fermi's wife
Georgy Flyorov: Soviet nuclear physicist
Winston Churchill: Prime Minister of the United Kingdom
Werner Heisenberg: Nuclear physicist, Hechingen, Germany
Cordell Hull: US secretary of state
Ivan Konev: Red Army general
Igor Kurchatov: Soviet nuclear physicist
Edward R. Murrow: Radio news broadcaster
Yoshio Nishina: Japanese nuclear physicist
Joachim von Ribbentrop: German foreign minister
Franklin D. Roosevelt: President of the United States
Mordechai Chaim Rumkowski: Eldest of the Jews in the Łódź ghetto
Joseph Stalin: General Secretary of the Communist Party of the Soviet Union
Leó Szilárd: Nuclear physicist with the Metallurgical Laboratory
Shigenori Tōgō: Japanese foreign minister
Georgy Zhukov: Marshal of the Soviet Union

Upsetting the Balance

Max Aitken, Lord Beaverbrook: British Minister of Supply
Kurt Chill: Wehrmacht Lieutenant General
Kurt Diebner: Nuclear physicist, Tübingen, Germany
Albert Einstein: Physicist, Couch, Missouri
Dwight D. Eisenhower: U.S. Army general, Couch, Missouri
Enrico Fermi: Nuclear physicist, Denver, Colorado
Robert H. Goddard: Rocket expert, Couch, Missouri
Lord Halifax: British ambassador to the United States
Benito Mussolini: Il Duce (Italian Dictator)
Joachim von Ribbentrop: German foreign minister
Joseph Stalin: General Secretary, Communist Party of the Soviet Union
Leó Szilárd: Nuclear physicist, Denver, Colorado

Striking the Balance

Menachem Begin: Jewish guerrilla, Haifa, Palestine
Omar Bradley: US Army lieutenant general, outside Denver
Walter von Brockdorff-Ahlefeldt: Wehrmacht lieutenant general, Riga, Latvia
Kurt Chill: Wehrmacht lieutenant general, Pskov, Soviet Union
William Joseph Donovan: US Army major general, Hot Springs, Arkansas
Anthony Eden: British foreign secretary
Robert H. Goddard: Rocket scientist, Hot Springs, Arkansas
Cordell Hull: President of the United States following the death of Franklin D. Roosevelt
Igor Kurchatov: Nuclear physicist, north of Moscow
Mao Zedong: Communist Party leader, Peking
George Marshall: US Secretary of State
Joachim von Ribbentrop: German foreign minister
Joseph Stalin: General Secretary of the Communist Party of the Soviet Union
Shigenori Tōgō: Japanese foreign minister

See also
 Alien space bats
 Kishin Corps, another alternate history series involving an alien invasion during World War II.

References

External links
 Worldwar Series; Official website

Alternate history book series
Alien invasions in novels
Science fiction book series
Novels about alien visitations
Novels set in fictional wars